The 1941 Estonian Football Championship was the 20th football league season in Estonia. First Round was scheduled from 25 May to 15 June. The championship was interrupted by Soviet occupation and later by the Nazi-German invasion.

Participants
Tallinna Dünamo
Tallinna Lokomotiv
Tartu Dünamo
AÜ Spordiselts
Tallinna Spartak
Pärnu Spartak

Estonian Football Championship
football
Estonia
Estonia
Estonia